Jaroslav Hatla (born 5 May 1973) is a Czech former equestrian. He competed at the 2004 Summer Olympics and the 2008 Summer Olympics.

References

External links
 

1973 births
Living people
Czech male equestrians
Olympic equestrians of the Czech Republic
Equestrians at the 2004 Summer Olympics
Equestrians at the 2008 Summer Olympics
People from Hořice
Sportspeople from the Hradec Králové Region